Myricanthe is a genus of plants in the family Euphorbiaceae first described as a genus in 1980. It has only one known species, Myricanthe discolor, endemic to New Caledonia.

References 

Monotypic Euphorbiaceae genera
Crotonoideae
Endemic flora of New Caledonia